The Dutch Military Proficiency Badge (Dutch: Militaire Lichamelijke Vaardigheid or MLV) is a military badge offered by the Royal Netherlands Army.

Requirements
 1000 m sprint (To be completed with helmet and rifle)
 5000 m run
 Hand grenade throwing 
 Rope climbing
 Cat crawling
 Obstacle Course

Completion of these requirements qualifies a candidate for the plain bronze badge.

Aquatic option
In addition to the requirements for the badge, an aquatic option is available for the Dutch Military Proficiency Badge. Completion of the aquatic option is indicated with a blue enamel field on the badge. 

The requirements for the swimming option are:

 200 meters swim
 15 meters underwater swim on one breath
 Swimming with rifle
 10 meters rescue pulling stroke

See also
 German Armed Forces Badge for Military Proficiency
 European Police Achievement Badge

References
 
 

Military awards and decorations of the Netherlands